The Long Beach and Asbury Park Railway was a profitable but short-lived miniature railway with the unusual gauge of , which operated from 1902 until 21 August 1903 at Long Beach in California.

History 
John J. Coit, an experienced locomotive driver, built the track of miniature railway together with his friends at cost of $1,200. He had previously worked as a master machinist at the Johnson Machine Works. Due to being physically handicapped he focused on a very user friendly design of his locomotives.

In the night from 21 to 22 August 1903 the whole roadbed, rails and ties of the Long Beach and Asbury Park Railway were washed away by the highest tide, which had been recorded until then.

Locomotive 
The 4-6-0 ten-wheeler steam locomotive of this railway was constructed by H. M. Leach of the Central Iron Works under Coit's supervision. It required four months for the five men who worked on it to complete the locomotive.

The complete train was equipped with a Westinghouse straight air brake.

See also 
 Billy Jones Wildcat Railroad 
 Eastlake Park Scenic Railway
 Seaside Park Railway
 Venice Miniature Railway
 Urbita Lake Railway

References 

Long Beach, California
14½ in gauge railways